Sir Andrew Patrick McEwen Forrest  (25 March 1923 – 7 August 2021) was a Scottish surgeon.

After qualifying in medicine from the University of St Andrews and completing a Fellowship at the Mayo in Rochester, Minnesota, he took up surgical posts first in Glasgow, then in Wales, followed by a position as Regius Chair of Clinical Surgery at Edinburgh.

His achievements in the field of breast cancer earned him the Lister Medal in 1987.

Life
Forrest was born in Lanarkshire and educated at the High School of Dundee. He then studied medicine at the University of St Andrews.

Following military service with the Royal Navy as a medical officer, he spent a year in Rochester, Minnesota as a Mayo Foundation Fellow, then in 1955 obtained a position at the University of Glasgow.

He became Chair of Surgery at the Welsh National School of Medicine in 1962. He moved to the University of Edinburgh to take up the Regius Chair of Clinical Surgery in 1971, where he eventually became emeritus.

He also served as Chief Scientist to the Scottish Department of Home and Health, and chaired the Department of Health working group on the implementation of the NHS Programme on breast cancer screening.

He was elected a member of The Royal Society of Edinburgh in 1976. In 1983 he was elected a member of the Aesculapian Club.

He died on 7 August 2021, at the age of 98.

Awards
Forrest received the Umberto Veronesi Award for the Future Fight Against Breast Cancer (2000). In 1987, he received the Lister Medal, "in recognition of his outstanding contribution to surgical science, particularly in the field of breast cancer".

Publications
Principles and Practice of Surgery
Breast Cancer: The Decision to Screen (1990)

References

External links 
 
 Portrait of Andrew Patrick McEwen Forrest at University Hospital of Wales, Cardiff (Art UK)

1923 births
2021 deaths
People from Lanarkshire
People educated at the High School of Dundee
Alumni of the University of St Andrews
Academics of the University of Glasgow
Academics of the University of Edinburgh
Scottish surgeons
Military personnel from Glasgow
Fellows of the Royal College of Surgeons
Fellows of the Royal College of Surgeons of Edinburgh
Royal Navy Medical Service officers
Royal Navy officers of World War II